Liana Finck is an American cartoonist and author. She is the author of Passing for Human and is a regular contributor to The New Yorker.

Early life and education 
Finck grew up in Chester, NY and studied fine art and graphic design at The Cooper Union in New York City, graduating in 2008. She earned a Fulbright Fellowship to travel to Belgium and research Georges Remi, the cartoonist and creator of Tintin.

Career 
Finck began contributing to The New Yorker in 2015 and maintains a monthly advice column comic called Dear Pepper. She appears in Very Semi-Serious, an HBO documentary about New Yorker cartoonists. The film follows Finck's early meetings with Bob Mankoff, then cartoon editor for The New Yorker, through the triumph of her first sale.

She has been an artist-in-residence at the New York Foundation for the Arts, Tablet, MacDowell, Yaddo, and the Lower Manhattan Cultural Center. She has also contributed to The Huffington Post, The Modern Golem, The Awl, and Catapult.

She regularly posts her drawings to her Instagram account, which has over 600,000 followers.

She drew the cover of the Ariana Grande and Justin Bieber single Stuck with U.

Books 
She received a grant from the Six Points Fellowship for Emerging Jewish Artists, and used the funds to create her first graphic novel, A Bintel Brief, published in 2014. The book is a collection of short stories based on early 20th-century letters written to a Yiddish advice column of the same name.

Her graphic memoir Passing For Human was published in September 2018. Vogue described the book as "a bildungsroman about an artist trying to understand her lifelong compulsion to make art."

She published Excuse Me: Cartoons, Complaints, and Notes to Self, a collection of comics, in September 2019. In April 2022, Finck published Let There Be Light: The Real Story of Her Creation, a graphic novel which reworks the Book of Genesis and features a female God.

Let There Be Light was longlisted for the inaugural Carol Shields Prize for Fiction in 2023.

Personal life 
Finck is Jewish and lives in New York City.

Selected works 

 A Bintel Brief, published by Ecco Press. April 15, 2014. .
 Passing for Human, published by Penguin Random House. September 18, 2018. .
 Excuse Me: Cartoons, Complaints, and Notes to Self, published by Penguin Random House. September 24, 2019. .

External links 

 Personal website
 New Yorker page

References 

American cartoonists
American women cartoonists
American women writers
American writers
The New Yorker cartoonists
1986 births
Living people
21st-century American women